Maol Sheachluinn na n-Uirsgéal Ó hÚigínn was an Irish bardic poet.

Background
Ó hÚigínn was a member of a well-known Irish family of bards or poets, based in Connacht. His surviving works include:
 Foraire Uladh ar Aodh
 Do bhriseas bearnaidh ar Bhrian
 Each gan aradhain an fhearg

See also
 Sean mac Fergail Óicc Ó hUiccinn, died 1490
 Philip Bocht Ó hUiginn
 Tadhg Mór Ó hUiginn

External links
Do bhriseas bearnaidh ar Bhrian 
Each gan aradhain an fhearg 
Foraire Uladh ar Aodh 

13th-century Irish writers
Medieval Irish poets
People from County Mayo
People from County Sligo
People from County Galway
Place of birth unknown
Place of death unknown
Year of birth unknown
Year of death unknown
Irish male poets
Irish-language writers